Bogmalo (pronounced ) is a small beach-side village in Goa, India. It is situated in a small bay with around a mile of curving sandy beach.

It is known to host conferences for AIESEC India every June or July.

Areas of interest also include the Naval Aviation Museum (India), curated by the Indian Navy, which showcases the history of Naval Aviation with illustrations and installations including many de-commissioned aircraft used by the military since Independence.

References

Beaches of Goa
Beaches of South Goa district
Villages in South Goa district